Ron Casey (born c. 1950) is a Canadian politician who was an elected member to the Legislative Assembly of Alberta representing the electoral district of Banff-Cochrane from 2012 to 2015.

He later joined the Alberta Party.

Electoral history

References

Progressive Conservative Association of Alberta MLAs
1950s births
Living people
21st-century Canadian politicians
Alberta Party politicians